Sugarloaf is a ghost town in Sugar Loaf Township, Rooks County, Kansas, United States.

History
Sugar Loaf (aka Sugarloaf) was issued a post office in 1878. The post office was renamed Sugarloaf in 1895. The Sugarloaf post office was discontinued in 1904. The population in 1910 was 15.

References

Former populated places in Rooks County, Kansas
Former populated places in Kansas
1878 establishments in Kansas
Populated places established in 1878